Robert Geoffrey Verdon-Roe (born 21 November 1965 in Winchester, Hampshire) is a British professional racing driver who has raced in various formats of motor sport throughout his career. He has won Formula Renault, TVR Tuscan and Historic Formula One Championships.

He is the grandson of Sir Alliott Verdon Roe who was a pioneer of British aviation and founder of the Avro aircraft company. He was educated at Ashdown House and Stowe School having been brought up in Portugal.

Racing career 
In 1988 he started racing in single-seaters, with no previous karting experience. Verdon-Roe came 3rd in the Formula First championship of 1988.

In 1989 he moved into Formula Ford and finished 3rd in the P&O European Ferries Championship behind David Coulthard and Kelvin Burt.

During 1990 and 1991 he raced in Formula Renault, culminating with him winning the Championship in 1991 after a heated battle with Jason Plato. He was nominated for an Autosport Award.

In 1992 Verdon-Roe switched to touring cars with a drive in a Vauxhall Cavalier for the Ecurie Ecosse team in the British Touring Car Championship. He also raced in the latter half of the Formula Vauxhall Championship that year.

In 1993 he drove a semi-works Toyota Carina E for the Park Lane Toyota Carina team. His best result that year was a 6th place at Snetterton and finished the championship down in 19th.

After a quiet spell which included a one-off race in Formula Three in 1994, Verdon-Roe returned to motorsport in the TVR Tuscan Challenge. In 1997 he won the TVR Tuscan championship overall and was nominated for an Autosport award. In 1998 he stayed with the factory team and finished a close 2nd in the championship and the same year, competed with the new TVR Speed 12 in the British GT Championship. He also had his first taste of Historic racing, teaming up with Gerry Marshall in a Jaguar E-Type at Silverstone, finishing third after gaining pole position.

In 1999 he briefly raced for the Lister works team in the FIA GT Championship, before returning to TVR and racing their new Cerbera Speed 12 GT car in the British GT Championship in 2000 and 2001, winning three races and eventually finishing 3rd in the championship.

Verdon-Roe also drove one-off races in the European Le Mans Series in 2001 and the Rolex 24 in 2002. In 2002 he returned to the Lister team and raced the Lister Storm in the FIA GT Championship. Highlights included a 2nd place at Silverstone and 2nd place at the Spa 24 hours, Lister's best ever result in a 24-hour race.

In 2003 he raced for the newly formed Creation Autosportif racing team driving the 2000 FIA GT Championship winning Lister Storm chassis (002) to 4th place in the FIA GT Championship.

In 2004 he again raced for Creation at Donington Park and the Spa 24 Hours in the Lister, and competed in various historic events including the Le Mans 24 Hours Grp C support race.

In 2005 he raced in the Le Mans 24 hours race driving a Dallara Nissan LMP1 car for the Rollcentre team, as well as the Spa 24 Hours for the Lister team.

In 2008 he won the Goodwood Revival's feature race, the RAC TT Celebration, driving a Ferrari 330 LMB with Peter Hardman, the first victory for a Ferrari in the TT since the Revival began.

In 2009 Verdon-Roe won FIA Historic Formula One Championship driving a McLaren M26. At the Revival he shared the Ferrari 330 LMB with Emanuele Pirro finishing 2nd.

In 2010 he won the Grand Prix Historique of Monaco aboard the ex-James Hunt McLaren. He also won the FIA Historic Formula One championship ground effect class and finished 2nd overall driving a McLaren MP4/1B. At the Goodwood Revival he shared the Ferrari with Tom Kristensen, but retired having started from pole position.

In 2011 he again finished 2nd overall in the FIA Historic Formula One Championship and won the ground effect class in the ex-Niki Lauda McLaren. At the Revival he raced Aston Martin DBR1-2 to 2nd place in the Sussex Trophy.

In 2012 he finished 2nd in the Grand Prix Historique of Monaco and 2nd in the Revival's TT Celebration race driving a Jaguar E-type.

Racing record

Complete British Touring Car Championship results
(key) (Races in bold indicate pole position) (Races in italics indicate fastest lap)

24 Hours of Le Mans results

Complete British GT Championship results
(key) (Races in bold indicate pole position) (Races in italics indicate fastest lap)

† – Drivers did not finish the race, but were classified as they completed a sufficient number of laps.

References

Other sources
 

1965 births
Living people
British Formula Three Championship drivers
FIA GT Championship drivers
British Touring Car Championship drivers
British GT Championship drivers
English racing drivers
24 Hours of Spa drivers
Sportspeople from Winchester
Ecurie Ecosse drivers
People educated at Stowe School